Edgar Bodenheimer (March 14, 1908 – May 30, 1991) was a German American author and professor of law in the United States.

Biography
Bodenheimer was born in Berlin in 1908.  He was educated in universities of Geneva, Munich, Heidelberg, and Berlin.  After receiving his J.U.D. from the University of Heidelberg in 1933, he emigrated  to the United States to escape from the Nazis. Without an American legal degree, he began working for the firm of Rosenberg, Goldmark & Colin. He later got his LL.B. from the University of Washington in 1937.

His career started in 1940 as an Attorney for the U.S. Department of Labor, where he worked for two years before taking on the Principal Attorney position at the Office of Alien Property Custodian in Washington D.C.

In 1945, Edgar served in the Allies' "Office of Chief of Counsel for prosecution of Axis Criminality", OCCPAC, at the Nuremberg Trials, utilizing his degrees in both American and German law.

He joined the law faculty of the University of Utah in 1946, and became a professor at the Law School of University of California, Davis in 1966. Retiring in 1975, he continued writing and lecturing at UC Davis as Professor Emeritus until his death in 1991

Works by Edgar Bodenheimer have been translated into Spanish, Portuguese, and Chinese.

Selected works
 Jurisprudence, McGraw-Hill 1940
 Jurisprudence: The Philosophy and Method of the Law, Harvard University Press 1962.
 Jurisprudence: The Philosophy and Method of the Law (revised edition), Harvard University Press 1974.
 Treatise on Justice, Philosophical Library 1967.
 Power, Law, And Society; A Study of the Will to Power and the Will to Law, Crane, Russak 1972.
 Philosophy of Responsibility, Fred Rothman 1980.

References

External links

American legal scholars
University of Washington School of Law alumni
Heidelberg University alumni
Ludwig Maximilian University of Munich alumni
Humboldt University of Berlin alumni
University of Utah faculty
University of California, Davis faculty
Legal educators
Legal writers
Jurists from Berlin
American people of German-Jewish descent
Jewish emigrants from Nazi Germany to the United States
1908 births
1991 deaths
20th-century German lawyers